Melbourne Bluff is a rocky bluff,  high, standing  south of Cape Bidlingmaier and protruding above the ice-covered slopes at the north side of Heard Island. The feature was surveyed in 1948 by the Australian National Antarctic Research Expeditions and so named by them because it trends roughly east-northeast in the general direction of Melbourne, Australia, the home headquarters of the expedition.

References

Cliffs of Antarctica